St. Nicholas Roman Catholic Church is a Catholic parish in Passaic, Passaic County, New Jersey, United States, in the Diocese of Paterson. It should not be confused with St. Nicholas Ukrainian Catholic Church, also located in Passaic.

The parish was founded in the 1860s by Franciscans from St. Bonaventure's in Paterson. In 1868, Bishop Bayley designated the community a parish and appointed a pastor, and a church and school were built on Prospect Street. The church was destroyed by fire in 1875 and replaced on the same site.

Construction on the current church on Washington, State and Ann Streets began in 1885 and was completed around 1889. The church added to the National Register in 1979.

See also
National Register of Historic Places listings in Passaic County, New Jersey

References

Churches in Passaic, New Jersey
Roman Catholic churches in New Jersey
Churches on the National Register of Historic Places in New Jersey
Gothic Revival church buildings in New Jersey
Roman Catholic churches completed in 1889
19th-century Roman Catholic church buildings in the United States
Churches in Passaic County, New Jersey
National Register of Historic Places in Passaic County, New Jersey
New Jersey Register of Historic Places
Roman Catholic Diocese of Paterson